Cabela's Big Game Hunter Ultimate Challenge, released on December 4, 2001 was the first Cabela's game to be released on the PlayStation console. The game was published by Activision, in conjunction with hunting supply company Cabela's.

External links
  allgame - Cabela's Big Game Hunter: Ultimate Challenge

2001 video games
North America-exclusive video games
PlayStation (console) games
PlayStation (console)-only games
Activision games
Cabela's video games
Video games developed in the United States
Coresoft games
Single-player video games